Win Sports+ is a Colombian pay television sports channel that was launched on 20 January 2020. The channel's programming consists of news reporting, live programs and broadcasts of the Colombian football Categoría Primera A, Categoría Primera B, and Copa Colombia.

References

External links 

 Official Website

RCN Televisión
Television networks in Colombia
Television stations in Colombia
Sports television networks
Television channels and stations established in 2020